John de Jesús (born 3 June 1955) is a Puerto Rican wrestler. He competed in the men's freestyle 48 kg at the 1976 Summer Olympics.

References

1955 births
Living people
Puerto Rican male sport wrestlers
Olympic wrestlers of Puerto Rico
Wrestlers at the 1976 Summer Olympics
Place of birth missing (living people)